Ernest Partridge (10 August 1895 – 20 April 1974) was a  Conservative Party politician in the United Kingdom.

At the 1951 general election he was elected Member of Parliament for the marginal Battersea South constituency, gaining the seat from Labour incumbent Caroline Ganley.  Partridge held the seat until the 1964 general election, when it was gained by Labour candidate Ernest Perry.

References

External links 

1895 births
1974 deaths
Conservative Party (UK) MPs for English constituencies
UK MPs 1951–1955
UK MPs 1955–1959
UK MPs 1959–1964
People educated at Wilson's School, Wallington